"La Boda" is a song by Bachata group Aventura. It's their second single from their fourth studio album God's Project.

Music Video
The Music video for "La Boda" starts out with Romeo and Lenny watching the news when it shows that Anthony's ex-girlfriend is getting married. They leave and invade the wedding and it shows flashbacks of Anthony and his ex's relationship.

Charts

References

2005 songs
2005 singles
Aventura (band) songs
bachata songs
Spanish-language songs
Songs written by Romeo Santos